Sascha Meinrath holds the Palmer Chair in Telecommunications at Penn State University. He is the founder of X-Lab, a future-focused technology policy and innovation think tank, and promotes the "Internet in a Suitcase" effort to create ad hoc mesh wireless technologies. Meinrath founded the Open Technology Institute in 2008 and directed the Institute while also serving as Vice President of the New America Foundation. He is also the co-founder and executive director of the CUWiN Foundation, a non-profit launched in 2000 that aims to develop "decentralized, community-owned networks that foster democratic cultures and local content," and in 2007 founded the Open Source Wireless Coalition, "a global partnership of open source wireless integrators, researchers, implementors and companies dedicated to the development of open source, interoperable, low-cost wireless network technologies." In 2012 he was elected as an Ashoka Global Fellow for leading support for Internet freedom in the United States and around the globe, as well as named to Newsweek's Digital Power Index Top 100 influencers among other “public servants defining digital regulatory boundaries” for his efforts to develop open-source, low-cost community wireless networks and his role in fighting Stop Online Piracy Act (SOPA) and the Protect IP Act (PIPA). In 2013 Time named Meinrath to the TIME Tech 40: The Most Influential Minds in Tech for his work to protect Internet freedom.

Background
Sascha Meinrath was born in New Haven, Connecticut. He received his Bachelor of Arts in Psychology from Yale University in 1997, and a   Masters of Arts in Social-Ecological Psychology from the University of Illinois at Urbana-Champaign. He is the son of a Brazilian immigrant to the U.S., and holds Brazilian, German, and U.S. citizenship.

Career
In 2004 Meinrath worked as a policy analyst for Free Press, a national media reform organization. In 2007 he moved to Washington, D.C., to become the Research Director of the Wireless Futures Program at the New America Foundation, launched the Open Technology Institute at New America Foundation in 2008, and became a Vice-President at New America and a co-founder of the Future of War Initiative. As the Palmer Chair in telecommunications at Pennsylvania State University, he has authored a study researching access to reliable broadband connection across the state.

Open Technology Institute
Meinrath launched the Open Technology Institute at the New America Foundation in 2008. The Open Technology Institute is based in Washington DC, but staff extend to both coasts of the United States as well as advisors and fellows in Europe. Major projects include Measurement Lab and Commotion Wireless. Newsweek highlighted the Open Technology Institute's efforts to develop open-source, low-cost community wireless networks, particularly in underserved areas.

Measurement Lab
Together with Google and a wide range of academics, researchers and institutions, Meinrath launched Measurement Lab (M-Lab), an open, distributed server platform for researchers to deploy Internet measurement tools founded in 2009.  The project has grown to have 99 servers at two-dozen locations around the globe supporting a range of broadband and computer networking measurement tools. All the data collected by M-Lab is made available to the research community.

Commotion Wireless
Commotion, is an open source “device-as-infrastructure” communication platform that integrates users’ existing cell phones, Wi-Fi enabled computers, and other wireless-capable devices to create community- and metro-scale, peer-to-peer communications networks. The project builds on existing mesh wireless technologies and gained widespread attention when, in 2011, the State Department announced funding for Commotion to lower barriers for building distributed communications networks. The project has been described as the "Internet in a Suitcase" by the New York Times."Internet in a Suitcase". Community wireless networks have been deployed with local community organizations in communities such as Philadelphia, Detroit and Brooklyn in the United States as well as Dahanu and Dharamshala, India, and Somaliland, Ethiopia, Additionally, Commotion was deployed with Occupy DC as well in the aftermath of Hurricane Sandy.

Associations

As of 2020, Meinrath serves on the board of Defending Rights & Dissent, the American Indian Policy Institute, Metamesh Wireless Communities, Brave New Software Foundation, and the Acorn Active Media Foundation.

Opposition to SOPA and PIPA
Meinrath was a leading voice against the Stop Online Piracy Act (SOPA) and the Protect IP Act (PIPA). He highlighted the human rights concerns raised by legislation including the likely collective punishment resulting from empowering law enforcement to take down an entire domain due to something posted on a single blog, as well as the implications for Internet freedom policies. In naming Meinrath to their Digital Power Index Top 100 Influencers, Newsweek noted his role as “one of the more prominent Internet culture leaders” to fight against the Stop Online Piracy Act (SOPA) and PROTECT IP Act. Following the defeat of SOPA and PIPA, Meinrath hosted the Washington, DC launch party for the Internet Defense League.

International Summit for Community Wireless Networks
Meinrath hosts the regular International Summit for Community Wireless Networks (IS4CWN), a convening of leaders in community networks, mesh networking, and next-generation wireless technologies. The first summit was held in Urbana-Champaign, Illinois in 2004 launching the community wireless movement. Past locations have also included St.  Charles, Missouri, Washington, DC, and Vienna, Austria. The eighth and most recent IS4CWN was held in October, 2013 in Berlin, Germany.

Publications
2013: Sascha D. Meinrath, James Losy and Benjamin Lennett. Internet Freedom, Nuanced Digital Dividess, and the Internet Craftsman. Afterward. The Digital Divide: The internet and social inequality in international perspective. Eds. Massimo Ragnedda and Glenn W. Muscher. London and New York: Routeledge.
2011: Sascha D. Meinrath, James Losey, and Victor Pickard. Digital Feudalism: Enclosures and Erasures from Digital Rights Management to the Digital Divide. The CommLaw Conspectus: Journal of Communications Law and Policy. Volume 19, Issue 2 (2011).
2010. Sascha D. Meinrath and Victor Pickard. The Rise of the Intranet Era: Politics and Media in an Age of Communications (R)evolution. Chapter for Kevin Howley (Ed.), Globalization and Communicative Democracy: Community Media in the 21st Century, London: Sage Publications.
2007. Sascha D. Meinrath and Victor Pickard. The New Network Neutrality: Criteria for Internet Freedom. Accepted for Publication: International Journal of Communications Law and Policy.
2007. S. Bradner, k.c. claffy, and Sascha D. Meinrath. The (un)Economic Internet. IEEE Internet Computing. Vol. 11(3). Pages 53–58.
 2007 Sascha D. Meinrath and k.c. claffy. COMMONS Strategy Workshop Final Report: Cooperative Measurement and Modeling of Open Networked Systems.
 2006: Sascha Meinrath and Ben Scott. Community Internet: Why Should Arts and Culture Funders Care. Grantmakers in the Arts Reader.
 2003: Ben Scott and Sascha Meinrath. Media Reform Explodes onto American Political Scene. Public i. Vol. 3(10).

References

External links
http://saschameinrath.com

Living people
Year of birth missing (living people)
People in information technology
People from New Haven, Connecticut
Yale University alumni
University of Illinois alumni
Ashoka Fellows
Ashoka USA Fellows